The Ndifuna Ukwazi (NU), translated from isiXhosa: Dare to Know, is a South African non-profit advocacy organisation established in 2011 to advocate for affordable housing in well-located urban spaces. The organisation does this by conducting policy research, community organisation, public advocacy, litigation, and the provision of legal services. Most of the organisation's activities focus on communities within the City of Cape Town.

The organisation has been critical of the City of Cape Town's policies and actions on policing the poor and homeless, evictions, and the sale of City property instead of using it for affordable housing. It has also criticised the South African Police Service (SAPS) and the Department of Defence for its urban housing policies.

References 

Organizations established in 2011
Social movements in South Africa
Non-profit organisations based in South Africa
Social welfare charities
Community-building organizations
Poverty-related organizations
Organisations based in Cape Town
Affordable housing advocacy organizations